Richard Lester Solomon (October 2, 1918 – October 12, 1995) was a psychologist well known for his work with in comparative psychology, as well as his opponent-process theory of emotion.

Solomon attended Brown University, where he earned a bachelor's degree (A.B.) in 1940, a master's degree (A.M.) in 1942, and a doctorate (Ph.D.) in 1947.

Solomon won several awards for his scientific achievements, including the Distinguished Scientific Contribution award of the American Psychological Association and the Howard Crosby WARREN Medal of the Society of Experimental Psychologists.  Additionally, he was elected to both the American Academy of Arts and Sciences and the National Academy of Sciences.  He also held several honorary posts, and edited the Psychological Review.

During his time at Harvard University, Solomon conducted research into avoidance learning. In his experiments, he placed dogs into shuttle boxes with two chambers. The lights would then come on in the side where the dog was. A few seconds later, one half of the chamber would become electrified. To avoid shock, the dog would run to the other chamber. Eventually, the dogs learned to avoid shock entirely by running to the other side in the interval between lighting and electrification.

See also
Solomon Four Group Design

References

Sources 
 "Biographical memoirs" from the National Academy of Sciences

20th-century American psychologists
1918 births
1995 deaths
Brown University alumni
Harvard University staff
Members of the United States National Academy of Sciences
20th-century American physicians
Fellows of the American Academy of Arts and Sciences
Academic journal editors